Pablo Ariel Paz Gallo (born 27 January 1973) is an Argentine retired footballer who played as a central defender.

In a career that spanned 15 years he played more in Spain than in his homeland, notably with Tenerife for which he appeared in 127 competitive games.

Paz represented Argentina at the 1998 World Cup.

Club career
Paz was born in Bahía Blanca, Buenos Aires. During his professional career he played for Newell's Old Boys, Club Atlético Banfield, CD Tenerife (his most fruitful period, playing in four La Liga seasons and also reaching the UEFA Cup), Club Atlético Independiente and Real Valladolid; in February 2001, he had an unsuccessful trial with Premier League club Everton.

Paz retired from the game altogether in 2013 at the age of 40, after several years in Spain's lower leagues and its amateur football. He started his managerial career with amateurs CD San Andrés, returning to Tenerife in the summer of 2014 and taking charge of the youth sides.

International career
Paz earned 14 caps for the Argentina national team in two years, his debut coming in 1996. He was part of the squad that appeared in the 1998 FIFA World Cup and, as the nation was already qualified, he played in the last group stage match against Croatia, a 1–0 win.

Additionally, Paz represented his country at the 1996 Summer Olympics, featuring twice in an eventual silver medal conquest.

References

External links
 Argentine League statistics  
 
 
 
   

1973 births
Living people
Sportspeople from Bahía Blanca
Argentine people of Spanish descent
Citizens of Spain through descent
Argentine footballers
Association football defenders
Argentine Primera División players
Newell's Old Boys footballers
Club Atlético Banfield footballers
Club Atlético Independiente footballers
La Liga players
Segunda División players
Segunda División B players
Tercera División players
CD Tenerife players
Real Valladolid players
Motril CF players
Argentina international footballers
1998 FIFA World Cup players
Olympic footballers of Argentina
Footballers at the 1996 Summer Olympics
Medalists at the 1996 Summer Olympics
Olympic silver medalists for Argentina
Olympic medalists in football
Pan American Games gold medalists for Argentina
Pan American Games medalists in football
Argentine expatriate footballers
Expatriate footballers in Spain
Argentine expatriate sportspeople in Spain
Argentine football managers
Argentine expatriate football managers
Expatriate football managers in Spain
Footballers at the 1995 Pan American Games
Medalists at the 1995 Pan American Games